Cornelius M'Gelany was an Irish priest in the late twelfth and early thirteenth centuries: the first recorded Archdeacon of Kildare (1190-1206).

References

12th-century Irish Roman Catholic priests
Archdeacons of Kildare
13th-century Irish Roman Catholic priests